The men's 1 metre springboard diving competition at the 2015 European Games in Baku took place on 18 June at the Baku Aquatics Centre.

Results
The preliminary round was started at 09:00. The final was held at 19:00.

Green denotes finalists

References

Men's 1 metre springboard